Pericampylus is a genus of flowering plants belonging to the family Menispermaceae.

Its native range is Tropical and Temperate Asia.

Species:
 Pericampylus glaucus (Lam.) Merr. 
 Pericampylus macrophyllus Forman

References

Menispermaceae
Menispermaceae genera